Bryan Habana is a South African rugby union player who plays on the wing.  , Habana has represented South Africa 124 times and has scored 67 tries. Habana's try total places him second on the all-time list, and also makes him South Africa's leading international try scorer. Habana has also scored more international tries outside his home country than any other player in history, with a total of 38 either away or at neutral venues.

Habana made his international debut for South Africa against England at Twickenham in 2004. It was during this match that Habana scored his first try, before scoring two tries against Scotland a week later. Habana played in South Africa's winning 2007 Rugby World Cup campaign, where he finished the tournament as the leading try scorer with eight, including four tries in a single match against Samoa.

When Habana scored a try against Italy on 21 November 2009, it meant that he had scored a try against each of the "Tier 1" nations.  The following year Habana scored another two tries against Italy in separate matches, the second of which brought Habana's total to 38, equalling the South African record set by Joost van der Westhuizen. Habana remained level with van der Westhuizen, failing to score for almost fifteen months, before ending his drought at the 2011 World Cup against Namibia.  Habana became the second South African to win the IRPA Try of the Year for his try against New Zealand in 2012.  Running between two defending players and chipping the ball over a third, Habana slid in to score in the South African's 21–11 defeat in the 2012 Rugby Championship.

International tries 
Key
 Won denotes that the match was won by South Africa
 Lost denotes that the match was lost by South Africa
 Drawn denotes that the match was drawn
  denotes the try was selected as the IRPA Try of the Year.

References 

Habana
International tries by Habana
International tries by Habana